Florence High School is a high school located in Florence, Wisconsin.
The school mascot is the Bobcats.  The school is situated on the NW corner of Olive Avenue and Norway Street.

History
The high school was established in 1900 and expanded in 1913. A fire in March 1929 destroyed the Old Florence High School. A new high school was designed in 1929 by Smith & Brant Architects of Manitowoc, Wisconsin and completed in 1930. The high school was remodeled in the 1970s with a new gymnasium and locker rooms in addition to classroom upgrades in the technical, science and home economics area. In 1993, another remodel included an addition which houses the school library and the Florence County Public Library.

Athletics
Florence is a part of the Northern Lakes Conference.

Football
Volleyball
Boys Basketball
Girls Basketball
Boys Golf
Girls Golf
Track and Field
Baseball
Softball
Wrestling
Poms

Organizations
Band
Jazz Ensemble
Chorus
Hi-Q
Drama Club
National Honor Society
Forensics
Spanish National Honor Society
Student Council
T.O.R.P.E.D.O.S.
Student Library Advisory Group (SLAG)

References

External links
School District of Florence County, Wisconsin

Public high schools in Wisconsin
Schools in Florence County, Wisconsin